The 14119 / 14120 Kathgodam Express is an Express train belonging to Indian Railways that runs between Kathgodam and  in India. It operates as train number 14119 from Kathgodam and Dehradun and as train number 14120 in the reverse direction.

Timetable

 14119 Kathgodam Express leaves Kathgodam every day at 19:45 hrs IST and reaches Dehradun at 04:20 hrs IST the next day.
 14120 Kathgodam Express leaves Dehradun every day at 22:55 hrs IST and reaches Kathgodam at 07:10 hrs IST the next day.

References 

Trains from Dehradun
Transport in Haldwani-Kathgodam
Named passenger trains of India
Rail transport in Uttarakhand
Express trains in India